Marex may refer to:

Medicine
 Marex, or Terbutaline, used as a "reliever" inhaler in the management of asthma symptoms among other uses

Companies
 Marex (British company) UK-based tech-enabled liquidity hub
 Sevilleja v Marex Financial Ltd 2020 Supreme Court of the United Kingdom 
 Marex telemetry Location-based service  (Nasdaq: MRXX)
 Marex, Miami Florida shipwreck recovery company established 1982 Wreck of the Titanic
 MarEx (The Maritime Executive), news service, Florida established 1997
 Marex Petroleum Juan de Nova Island